Tropaeolum adpressum is a flowering plant in the family Tropaeolaceae. It is commonly known as nasturtium. The plant is native to Colombia and Ecuador. The flowers have a red cone shaped body with green petals. The body of adpressum is covered in fine hair-like structures. Adpressum can be found from 700m-3000m

References 

adpressum
Plants described in 1922
Flora of Colombia
Flora of Ecuador